Erythrina america (coral tree, colorines, colorín, or pemoches), is a flowering plant of the genus Erythrina which is native to Mexico.  Colorín (plural colorines) is the name of a type of tree, Erythrina americana also called Tzompāmitl. The word colorín means color chillón—a “gaudy” or “loud” color (Williams 1959).

Colorines plant also called, cuchillitos (little knives) or machetitos (little machetes), zompantle, or coral is a nice flower, red in color and every individual flower resembles a little machete, the flower is edible and is boiled (only the red part of the flower) and cooked with scrambled eggs or tuna in many parts of south Mexico.

This variety flowers during the dry season (April) in many parts, and the plant is very popular with hummingbirds because of the bright red color, the plant ranges from a few feet off the ground to trees five meters tall.

The earliest depiction of this tree in America is in the Florentine Codex. In the 17th century, Francisco Hernández  commented: "The juice from the flowers of this tree, given to children induces drowsiness and sleepless".

Other sites explain that although the flower is edible, the seeds and everything else in the tree is highly toxic, in Mexico, the grounded seeds are used as rat poison and the bark is used as fish poison.

Description
E. americana is a tree that grows to 4-5m. It has pale, brown, smooth bark and a spreading and profusely branching crown. It sheds its leaves during winter and the dry season. It has sprines on the branches and conical, flat spines on the trunk. Leaves are arranged alternately and are trifoliate with rhombic-ovate leaflets that are 7-22cm long and broad.

Uses
The flower is edible, This tree is very popular with kids who use the flowers as a little knives to stab each other. The ground seeds and bark are used as poison, The tree is also used to make traditional crafts in many Mexican states, specially traditional dance masks and is also used as fence post in many parts of Veracruz Mexico, it is a beautiful and hardy tree, some varieties even tolerate frost.

The tall varieties of this plant are rarely used as a garden plant, but the dwarf varieties are used as garden plants because they tolerate frost, they tolerate heat and come from dry places, and they flower early and attract hummingbirds.

References

See also
 https://web.archive.org/web/20140407154001/http://www.medicinatradicionalmexicana.unam.mx/monografia.php?l=3&t=Erythrina%20americana&id=7174

americana
Plants described in 1768
Flora of Mexico
Taxa named by Philip Miller